Hasan Hüseyin Acar (born 16 December 1994) is a Turkish footballer who plays as a midfielder for Altınordu.

Club career
He made his Süper Lig debut on 18 August 2013.

On 11 June 2018, he has signed a 3 year contract with Kayserispor.

On 31 August 2022, Acar signed a one-year deal with Altınordu.

References

External links
 Hasan Hüseyin Acar at TFF.org
 Hasan Hüseyin Acar at goal.com
 
 

1994 births
Living people
Sportspeople from Eskişehir
Turkish footballers
Association football midfielders
Turkey youth international footballers
Eskişehirspor footballers
Göztepe S.K. footballers
Tokatspor footballers
Kayserispor footballers
Alanyaspor footballers
MKE Ankaragücü footballers
Altınordu F.K. players
Süper Lig players
TFF First League players
TFF Second League players
21st-century Turkish people